Nitin Shrivastava is an Indian urologist and academic. Srivastava received training from Maulana Azad Medical College and completed his superspecialisation at AIIMS. Dr Nitin was a fellow at Department of Urology at Oxford University. His work revolves around use of robotics for renal oncology.

Publications 

 Robot-assisted laparoscopic radical cystectomy with extracorporeal urinary diversion: Initial experience and outcomes, 
 The Spectrum of Clinical and Urodynamic Findings in Patients with Spinal Tuberculosis Exhibiting Lower Urinary Tract Symptoms, before and after Spinal Surgical Intervention with Antitubercular Treatment: A Prospective Study, 
 Punctures versus shocks: a comparison of renal functional and structural changes after percutaneous nephrolithotomy and shockwave lithotripsy for solitary renal stone
 Percutaneous Management of Systemic Fungal Infection Presenting As Bilateral Renal Fungal Ball
 Device malfunction with the da Vinci S® surgical system and its impact on surgical procedures
 Renal cell carcinoma with sarcomatoid transformation, presenting as skin rashes
 Device Malfunction with the da Vinci S Surgical System and Impact on Surgical Procedures: Could Device Aging be Responsible?

References 

Indian medical academics
Indian medical researchers
Year of birth missing (living people)
Living people